Crossing a Shadow is a 2007 Peruvian film directed by Augusto Tamayo. It was Peru's submission to the 80th Academy Awards for the Academy Award for Best Foreign Language Film, but was not accepted as a nominee.

See also

Cinema of Peru
List of submissions to the 80th Academy Awards for Best Foreign Language Film

References

External links

2007 films
2007 drama films
Peruvian drama films
2000s Peruvian films
2000s Spanish-language films